Count Pyotr Aleksandrovich Valuev (September 22, 1815 – January 27, 1890) was a Russian statesman and writer.

Life 
Valuev was born in the Tsaritsyno District of Moscow on September 22, 1815.

Valuev served as Emperor Alexander II's Minister of Interior between April 23, 1861 to March 9, 1868, and as Minister of State Assets from February 17, 1872 to 1877. In 1877, he was made Chairman of the Committee of Ministers. In 1880, his influence began to decline when he was eclipsed by his opponent, Count Loris-Melikov. Valuev was sent into retirement in October 1881 by the son of the recently assassinated Alexander II, Alexander III, since as Minister of State Assets, he had held final responsibility for the so-called plundering of the Bashkir lands in the 1870s.

Valuev was always close to the literary world. In 1834 he was transferred from Moscow to St. Petersburg and became acquainted with prominent Russian poets Aleksandr Pushkin and Pyotr Vyazemsky. Valuev may have served as one of the prototypes for the protagonist of Pushkin's novel The Captain's Daughter (1836), and the same year he married Vyazemsky's daughter.

Valuev began writing fiction in the 1870s while still serving in the government. His first novel, Lorin (1878) was circulated in manuscript, although it remained unpublished until 1882. Once he was retired, he concentrated on writing and published four novels, essays on history of Christianity and a devotional calendar with his poetry prior to his death in 1890 in St. Petersburg.

Throughout most of his adult life, Valuev kept a diary, which was published after his death and has proved to be an important source of information on the inner circle of the Russian Empire in the 19th century.

See also
 Valuev Circular

References

 Yu. V. Zeldich. Pyotr Aleksandrovich Valuev i ego vremya (Pyotr Aleksandrovich Valuev and His Time), Moscow, Agraf, 2005, 676p.
 James A. Malloy, Jr. "Petr Aleksandrovich Valuev" in The Modern Encyclopedia of Russian and Soviet History, volume 41, Academic International Press, 1996-2003
 N.R. Antonov. "Graf Pyotr Aleksandrovich Valuev" in Russkie svetskie bogoslovy i ih religiozno-obschetvennoe mirosozertsanie, volume 1, St. Petersburg, 1912, reprinted in Pyotr Valuev. Cherny bor: Povesti, stat'i, Moscow, Agraf, 2002.

1815 births
1890 deaths
Writers from Moscow
People from Moscow Governorate
Politicians of the Russian Empire
Interior ministers of Russia
Members of the State Council (Russian Empire)
Russian nobility
Novelists from the Russian Empire
Male writers from the Russian Empire
Poets from the Russian Empire
Russian male poets
Anti-Ukrainian sentiment
Russian male novelists
19th-century poets from the Russian Empire
19th-century novelists from the Russian Empire
19th-century male writers from the Russian Empire
Burials at Tikhvin Cemetery
Russification
Politicians from Moscow